WFHK (1430 AM, "94.1 The River") is a radio station licensed to serve the community of Pell City, Alabama, United States. The station broadcasts to the eastern area of the greater Birmingham, Alabama, area and is the only commercial radio station in St. Clair County, Alabama. Including its broadcast translator at 94.1 FM (W231CW), the station broadcasts into 7 counties to include; St. Clair, Jefferson, Shelby, Talladega, Calhoun, Etowah, and Blount. The station is owned by Stocks Broadcasting, Inc.

Programming
WFHK airs an adult contemporary format which plays hits of the 1970s, 1980s, 1990s & today. The morning show consists of long-time radio partners John Simpson and Adam Stocks. (Stocks is also the owner of Stocks Broadcasting, Inc.) The two have been together on WFHK since 2000 and discuss everything from local politics to world news.  In addition to the morning show, John Simpson is on-air during middays and Adam Stocks covers the afternoon drive time slot. Jeremy Gossett is on-air during the evenings until midnight.

On Saturday, Jennifer Jones hosts a 30-minute "Swap Shop" where live callers buy, sell, trade, rent, giveaway, and announce yard sales.  The Swap Shop has been running on WFHK since 1956.  Birmingham radio veteran and television voice over talent Jim Lucas is on air the rest of the day.

Sundays, WFHK airs the 1980s Edition of Rick Dees Weekly Top 40 which includes the countdown program in its entirety as it aired in the 1980s.

History
The station was granted its original construction permit by the Federal Communications Commission on November 2, 1955. WFHK began broadcasting in 1956.

In February 1999, St. Clair Broadcasting System, Inc. (Betty Williamson, president) reached an agreement to sell WFHK to Williamson Broadcasting, Inc. (Douglas Williamson, president). The station sold for a reported $10,000. The deal was approved by the FCC on April 14, 1999, and the transaction was consummated on May 14, 1999.

In January 2001, Williamson Broadcasting, Inc., reached an agreement to sell WFHK to Stocks Broadcasting, Inc. The station sold for a reported $275,000. The deal was approved by the FCC on February 27, 2001, and the transaction was consummated on March 1, 2001.

Stocks Broadcasting owner Adam Stocks was elected mayor of Pell City in 2004.

On February 11, 2015, Stocks Broadcasting, Inc. launched "94.1 FM The River".

Awards and honors
In October 2001, WFHK was named Small Business of the Year for 2001 by the Greater Pell City Chamber of Commerce.

References

External links
WFHK official website
94.1 The River Facebook

FHK
Mainstream adult contemporary radio stations in the United States
Radio stations established in 1956
St. Clair County, Alabama
1956 establishments in Alabama
FHK